Budu Dogon or Bunoge, also known as Korandabo, is a recently discovered Dogon language spoken in Mali. It was first reported online. The plural suffix on nouns is closest to Kolum so, suggesting it should be classified as a West Dogon language.

The people call themselves Budu, and Tɔmmɔ-sɔ speakers call the language Budu-sɔ. It has also been called Budu-Tagu, the name of the principal Budu village.

References

 .

External links
Bunoge wordlist (Dendo and Blench, 2005)

Dogon languages
Languages of Mali